Mykola Fedorovych Kolumbet (also Nikolay Kolumbet; ; ; 10 October 1933 – 21 February 2012) was a Ukrainian cyclist. He competed at the 1956 Summer Olympics in the road race and finished in 16th place individually and in sixth place with the Soviet team.

He won three Peace Races in the team competition (1956, 1958, 1959). In 1956 he finished in third place individually and became the first Soviet cyclist to win an etape of the Peace Race.

After retirement from competitions he worked as a coach and prepared 54 champions of Ukraine or Soviet Union, as well as Olympians Igor Tselovalnikov and Anatoly Starkov. For his achievements he was awarded the Medal "For Labour Valour".  He lived in the village of Bremenskoe, Chernihiv Oblast.

His younger brother Leonid competed in cycling at the 1960 and 1964 Olympics.

References

1933 births
2012 deaths
Ukrainian male cyclists
Soviet male cyclists
Olympic cyclists of the Soviet Union
Cyclists at the 1956 Summer Olympics
Place of birth missing